Antonio Marullo (died 1648) was a Roman Catholic prelate who served as Archbishop of Manfredonia (1643–1648).

Biography
Antonio Marullo was born in Palermo, Italy.
On 31 Aug 1643, he was appointed during the papacy of Pope Urban VIII as Archbishop of Manfredonia.
On 20 Sep 1643, he was consecrated bishop by Ulderico Carpegna, Cardinal-Priest of Sant'Anastasia, with Diego Sersale, Archbishop of Bari-Canosa, and Giovan Battista Foppa, Archbishop of Benevento, serving as co-consecrators.
He served as Archbishop of Manfredonia until his death on 18 Dec 1648.

References

External links and additional sources
 (for Chronology of Bishops) 
 (for Chronology of Bishops)  

17th-century Italian Roman Catholic archbishops
Bishops appointed by Pope Urban VIII
1648 deaths